William Henry Kuhlken (17 April 1910 – 5 September 1957) was an Australian rules footballer who played with Geelong and Carlton.

Death
He died (following a heart attack) at St Vincent's Hospital, Melbourne on 5 September 1957.

Footnotes

References
 Holmesby, Russell & Main, Jim (2007). The Encyclopedia of AFL Footballers. 7th ed. Melbourne: Bas Publishing.

External links
 
 
 Will Kuhlken, at Blueseum.
 Bill Kuhlken, at The VFA Project.

1910 births
Australian rules footballers from Victoria (Australia)
Geelong Football Club players
Carlton Football Club players
Port Melbourne Football Club players
1957 deaths